Alejandro Andrés Zambra Infantas (Santiago, Chile, b. September 24, 1975) is a Chilean poet, short story writer and novelist. He has been recognized for his talent as a young Latin American writer, chosen in 2007 as one of the "Bogotá39" (the best Latin American writers under the age of 39) and in 2010 by Granta as one of the best Spanish-language writers under the age of 35.

Early life and education
Alejandro Zambra was raised in 1975 in Maipú, Chile, a suburb of Santiago, during the dictatorship of Augusto Pinochet. In a magazine interview with his close friend from his Master's program, Zambra explains his thoughts on growing up in Chile during the 1970s and 1980s. Growing up in such a time, Zambra considers himself and his generation, "children of the dictatorship." He later describes how his life changed after Pinochet's end of power, "The nineties were a time of smudging out. The dictatorship tried to impose all of those stupid discourses, and those discourses erased us."

Zambra studied at the Instituto Nacional General José Miguel Carrera and the University of Chile, from which he graduated in 1997 with a degree in Hispanic literature. He won a scholarship to pursue postgraduate studies in Madrid, where he obtained an MA in Hispanic studies. Back in Chile, he received a PhD in literature from the Pontifical Catholic University.

Career 
Zambra describes the beginning of his writing career as, "I wouldn’t choose to be a writer. Actually I don’t think I ever chose it, I was just undeniably worse at other things." Zambra began with writing poetry, citing influences such as Nicanor Parra, Jorge Teillier, Gonzalo Millán, and Enrique Lihn, and his brief novels are noted for their poetic natures. He is often noted for his successful use of metafiction, or writing about writing, in his novels. Short stories and articles by Zambra have been featured in magazines such as The New Yorker, The Paris Review, McSweeney's Quarterly Concern, Babelia, and Quimera. Zambra also has worked as a literary critic for the newspaper La Tercera and as a professor at the School of Literature at Diego Portales University in Santiago.

Bonsái 
Zambra's first novel, Bonsái, attracted much attention in Chile and appeared in the Spanish Editorial Anagrama, which was awarded the Chilean Critics Award for best novel of the year in 2006. As the highly influential Santiago newspaper El Mercurio summed up, "The publication of Bonsai ... marked a kind of bloodletting in Chilean literature. It was said (or argued) that it represented the end of an era, or the beginning of another, in the nation's letters."  Bonsái was eventually translated into several languages, such as English at Melville Publishing House by Carolina Robertis. Just five years later, the book was turned into a film of the same name directed by Christían Jiménez, and presented at the Cannes Film Festival in 2011.

The Private Lives of Trees 
In this second novel, a writer tells his stepdaughter a bedtime story called "The Private Lives of Trees" (same title as the novel), which he plans to end when the mother returns home from work. This novel appears to be somewhat autobiographical, as the man in the story also has finished a book about bonsai trees, referencing Zambra's previous successful novel Bonsái.

Ways of Going Home 
His 2013 novel Ways of Going Home is fictional but draws heavily on Zambra's childhood experience under the Pinochet dictatorship. The novel switches between the memory of a nine-year-old boy growing up during a restrictive dictatorship and the life of the narrator who is writing the story, an example of meta-writing, or writing about writing. "This small novel contains a surprising vastness, created by its structure of alternating chapters of fiction and reality," Adam Thirlwell writes in The New York Times. "Almost every miniature event or conversation is subject to a process of revision, until you realize that Zambra is staging not just a single story of life under political repression, but the conditions for telling any story at all."

Bibliography

Poetry 
 1998 - Bahía Inútil, poems 1996–1998, Ediciones Stratis, Santiago, 
 2003 - Mudanza, Santiago, Quid Ediciones.

Novels 
 2006 - Bonsái, Barcelona, Anagrama. 
 2007 - La vida privada de los árboles, Barcelona, Anagrama.
 2011 - Formas de volver a casa, Barcelona, Anagrama.
 2014 - Facsímil, Santiago, Hueders; Buenos Aires, Eterna Cadencia (2015); Madrid, Sexto Piso (2015). 
 2020 - Poeta chileno, Barcelona, Anagrama.

Short stories 
 2013 - Mis documentos (Anagrama, Barcelona), 11 stories, translated as My documents
 2022 - Skyscrapers (The New Yorker), translated by Megan McDowell

Criticism and essays 
 2010 - No leer, compilation of critiques, Barcelona, Alpha Decay, 2012. 
 2019 - Tema libre, compilation of short stories, essays, and chronicles, Barcelona, Anagrama.

English translations
 Bonsai
 Translated by Carolina De Robertis. Melville House Publishing, 2008.
 Translated by Megan McDowell, 2022
 The Private Lives of Trees. Translated by Megan McDowell. Open Letter Books, 2010.
 Ways of Going Home. Translated by Megan McDowell. Farrar, Straus and Giroux, 2013.
 My Documents. Translated by Megan McDowell. McSweeney's, 2015.
 Multiple Choice. Translated by Megan McDowell. Penguin Books, 2016.
 
 Chilean Poet. Translated by Megan McDowell. Viking Books, 2022.

Critical studies and reviews of Zambra's work
Not to read

Film adaptions 
 Bonsái, 2017
 Family Life, 2011

Awards 

 2005 Literature-art award III for the poem Directions in collaboration with Sachiyo Nishimura
2007 Critic of Chile Award for Bonsái (best novel of 2006)
 2007 National Council of Reading and Books Award for Bonsái (best novel of 2006)
2007 Finalist for Altazor Prize for Bonsái
2008 Finalist for Best Translated Book of the year for Bonsái
2010 Best Young Spanish-Language Novelists as chosen by Granta
2010 Finalist for Prix du Marais  for The Private Lives of Trees
 2012 Altazor prize for Ways of Going Home (best narrative of 2011)
 2012 Nominated for an International IMPAC Dublin Literary Award for The Private Lives of Trees
 2012 Finalist for The Americas Award for Ways of Going Home
 2012 Finalist Medici Prize for Ways of Going Home (Secondary Persons)
 2012 National Council of Reading and Books Award for Ways of Going Home
 2013 Prince Claus Award
 2014 Miniciple Literature of Santiago Prize- general story for My Documents
 2014 Finalist for Hispanic-American Prize for Gabriel García Márquez story
2015-2016 Cullman Center fellow at the New York Public Library

References

Further reading
 Manuel Clemens (2019). Chilean Childhood around 1990: Alejandro Zambra Intensifies the Past”. In: Bulletin of Contemporary Hispanic Studies, Issue 1, Vol. 1, pp. 15–30.
 Bieke Willem (2015). “A Suburban Revision of Nostalgia : the Case of Ways of Going Home by Alejandro Zambra”. In: Ameel, L., Finch, J. & Salmela, M. eds. Literature and the peripheral city. Palgrave Macmillan. 184–197.
 Bieke Willem (2013). “Desarraigo y nostalgia : el motivo de la vuelta a casa en tres novelas chilenas recientes”. Iberoamericana, 51(3), 139–157.
 Bieke Willem (2012). “Metáfora, alegoría y nostalgia : la casa en las novelas de Alejandro Zambra”. Acta Literaria 45 (December) 25–42.

External links
 2015 Bomb Magazine interview of Alejandro Zambra by Daniel Alarcón

1975 births
Living people
20th-century Chilean male writers
20th-century Chilean poets
21st-century Chilean male writers
21st-century Chilean novelists
21st-century Chilean poets
21st-century Chilean short story writers
Chilean essayists
Chilean male novelists
Chilean male short story writers
The New Yorker people
People from Santiago